Petr Chaloupka (born April 4, 1986) is a Czech professional ice hockey defenceman currently signed to	Hockeytvåan side Grästorps IK. Chaloupka most recently played with Podhale Nowy Targ in the Polska Hokej Liga. He previously played with Dundee Stars in the Elite Ice Hockey League during the 2018-19 season.

References

External links

1985 births
Living people
BK Mladá Boleslav players
Dundee Stars players
Podhale Nowy Targ players
Czech ice hockey defencemen
Czech expatriate ice hockey players in Slovakia
Expatriate ice hockey players in Scotland
Expatriate ice hockey players in Poland
Czech expatriate ice hockey players in Sweden
Czech expatriate ice hockey players in Germany
Czech expatriate sportspeople in Scotland
Czech expatriate sportspeople in Poland